Babikian is a surname. Notable people with the surname include:

Khatchig Babikian (1924–1999), Lebanese Armenian attorney, politician, former member of the Lebanese Parliament (1957–1999) and Government minister
Viken Babikian, American Armenian doctor and professor of neurology